Thecidellina is a genus of brachiopods belonging to the family Thecidellinidae.

The species of this genus are found in Pacific and Atlantic Ocean.

Species:

Thecidellina alabamensis 
Thecidellina bahamiensis 
Thecidellina barretti 
Thecidellina blochmanni 
Thecidellina congregata 
Thecidellina europa 
Thecidellina insolita 
Thecidellina japonica 
Thecidellina leipnitzae 
Thecidellina mawaliana 
Thecidellina maxilla 
Thecidellina meyeri 
Thecidellina williamsi

References

Brachiopod genera